Flavobacterium dispersum is a Gram-negative, strictly aerobic and motile bacterium from the genus of Flavobacterium which has been isolated from a freshwater spring in Taiwan.

A novel bacterial strain MVW-23T was isolated from a freshwater spring in Taiwan. The strain was Gram-staining-negative, strictly aerobic, motile by gliding, rod-shaped and formed translucent yellow colonies.

References

dispersum
Bacteria described in 2017